Williamson-Kennedy School is a historic school building located at Poplar Bluff, Butler County, Missouri. It was built in 1922, and is a three-story, rectangular plan, Colonial Revival style brick building. It sits on a cast concrete foundation and has a flat roof. The two primary entrances located in one-story projecting wings at the corners of the building and features cast concrete Doric orderpilasters.

It was listed on the National Register of Historic Places in 1998.

References

School buildings on the National Register of Historic Places in Missouri
Colonial Revival architecture in Missouri
School buildings completed in 1922
Buildings and structures in Butler County, Missouri
National Register of Historic Places in Butler County, Missouri
1922 establishments in Missouri